Avenue is an unincorporated community in what is familiarly called the "Seventh District" of St. Mary's County, Maryland, United States.

References

Unincorporated communities in St. Mary's County, Maryland
Unincorporated communities in Maryland